The Kanosh Shale is a geologic formation in Utah. It preserves fossils dating back to the Ordovician period.

See also

 List of fossiliferous stratigraphic units in Utah
 Paleontology in Utah

References
 

Ordovician geology of Utah